The  is a railway line operated by East Japan Railway Company (JR East) connecting Morioka Station in Morioka, Iwate and Ōmagari Station in Daisen, Akita, Japan.

History
Services to Hashiba Station ended in the 1940s.

In 1964, the Shizukuishi to Akabuchi section opened, and upon completion of the  Sengan Tunnel, the Akabuchi to Tazawako section opened on 20 October 1966, completing the line.

Freight services ceased in 1982, the year the entire line was electrified.

In 1997, the line was converted to  gauge, and became part of the Akita Shinkansen, with standard-gauge electric multiple unit (EMU) trains providing local services on the line.

In January 2022 it was announced that Maegata Station would be added between Morioka Station and Ōkama Station. Maegata station opened for service on 18 March 2023.

Station list

Passing loops
  is a passing loop located in Shizukuishi, Iwate.
  is a passing loop located in Senboku, Akita.()

Rolling stock 
As of 2022, 701-5000 series trains belonging to Akita General Rolling Stock Center are used on this line.

References

External links

 Stations of the Tazawako Line (JR East) 

 
Lines of East Japan Railway Company
Rail transport in Iwate Prefecture
Rail transport in Akita Prefecture
Standard gauge railways in Japan
Railway lines opened in 1921
1921 establishments in Japan